Statistics of Ekstraklasa for the 1988–89 season.

Overview
It was contested by 16 teams, and Ruch Chorzów won the championship.

League table

Results

Relegation playoffs 
After the end of the season, play-offs played for two places in the first league in the 1989–90 season between teams from places 13-14 in the first league and runners-up in the 2nd league groups:
 13th team of the I league and 2nd team of the II league of group II - Pogoń Szczecin and Motor Lublin,
 14th team of the I league and 2nd team of the II league of group I - GKS Jastrzębie and Zawisza Bydgoszcz.

Pogoń Szczecin and GKS Jastrzębie did not hold places at the highest league level.

Top goalscorers

References

External links
 Poland – List of final tables at RSSSF 

Ekstraklasa seasons
1988–89 in Polish football
Pol